Jorge Luis Velosa Ruiz, better known as Jorge Velosa (born October 6, 1949), is a Colombian veterinary physician singer-songwriter born in the small town of Ráquira in the Boyacá Department, widely famous in his country for being the creator of the folk musical genre known as carranga.

Biography

Early life
Velosa is the sixth of seven siblings. After completing his elementary education, he had to move to Bogotá to complete his secondary education, as there were no schools in his hometown. In the 1970s Velosa was admitted to National University of Colombia in Bogotá, where he obtained a degree as a veterinary physician. There he met Javier Moreno, who made him the proposal to rescue and spread the traditional folkloric music from the Andes region in Colombia. After creating a band with Moreno and others, called Los Hermanos Rodríguez, they jumped to fame after an invitation to the festival Guitarra de Plata Campesina (Farmer Silver Guitar), organized by the local radio station Radio Furatena in Chiquinquirá. With this success they were invited to create a radio program for the station, which was to be called “Canta el Pueblo” (People Sing) with the idea of interacting with the locals and thus learning from them the traditions and folk knowledge. Because of this Velosa never actually practiced veterinary medicine, and rather engaged in acting, radio hosting, Costumbrismo poetry, and, particularly, to music. With the group he managed to gather he created a new musical genre called carranga which has become one of the most outstanding examples of Colombian folk music.

Los Carrangueros 

The music ensemble he founded was named "Los Carrangueros de Ráquira", and was later renamed "Jorge Velosa y los Hermanos Torres," and finally, "Velosa y los Carrangueros." The remaining musicians were  Jorge Eliecer González, José Fernando Rivas, y Manuel Cortés; Velosa sings and plays guacharaca and harmonica. Some of his most famous songs are "La cucharita", "Julia, Julia, Julia", "Las diabluras", "La gallina mellicera" and "El rey pobre". Velosa has also played roles in comedies in the national television such as Don Chinche and Romeo y buseta.

He has been considered the first Colombian artist to play live in Madison Square Garden in New York City in 1981. Velosa and the Carrangueros were invited to the "Gran Fiesta en el Madison," a Latin-American variety show at the Madison Square Garden during the days of October 10 and 11, 1981. They were described by the New York Times as "the only real folk music of the event," and shared the stage with incredibly famous Latin-American singers and musicians like Astor Piazzolla, José Luis Rodríguez, Camilo Sesto, Roberto Carlos, Miguel Bosé, Lucía Méndez, and Tito Puente. About the gig, Velosa humorously tells that they were not picked up by the limousine that was sent for them because of their wearing the traditional ruanas (a poncho-like woolen coat) and hats that they use on each of their presentations.

On September 25, 1999, the car that transported him and his band from a late concert towards the city of Bucaramanga was intercepted by guerrilla soldiers from the Popular Liberation Army (EPL), who after recognizing him decided to kidnap him, after releasing all of the other band members. Later, the guerrilla group would claim that Velosa had been kidnapped for political reasons rather than for monetary purposes. After numerous protests throughout the country, and some conciliation by officials from the government he was released on October 14, 1999.

In celebration of his 30th anniversary as a professional musician, in 2010 he had a concert tour with the National Symphony Orchestra of Colombia.

Distinctions

As a sign of recognition to his work, biologist John Lynch named two recently found species of frogs in Colombia after him, Eleutherodactylus carranguerorum and Eleutherodactylus jorgevelosai.

Discography

Los Carrangueros de Ráquira 
 Carrangueros de Ráquira (FM, 1980)
 ¡Viva quien toca! (FM, 1981)
 Así es la vida (FM, 1982)

Solo career
 Cantas y Relatos (FM, 1983)

Jorge Velosa y Los Hnos.Torres 
 Pa’ los pies y el corazón (1984)
 Con alma, vida y sombrero (1985)
 Entre Chiste y chanza (1986)
 Alegría carranguera (1987)
 El que canta sus penas espanta (1988)
 A ojo cerrado (1989)
 De mil amores (1990)

Velosa y Los Carrangueros 
 Harina de otro costal (Fuentes, 1992)
 Sobando la pita (Fuentes, 1993)
 Revolando en cuadro (Fuentes, 1994)
 Marcando calavera (Fuentes, 1996)
 En cantos verdes (Fuentes, 1998)
 Patiboliando (MTM, 2002)
 Lero-Lero, Candelero (MTM, 2003)
 Surungusungo (MTM, 2005)
 Carranga Sinfónica (MTM, 2011)

Collections
 Las clásicas con Los Hermanos Torres y Los Carrangueros de Ráquira (FM, 1990)
 Una historia carranguera (FM, 2000)
 Historia Musical del Carranguero Mayor (Fuentes, 2001)

See also
List of kidnappings
List of solved missing person cases

References

Books
 Serrano, Claudia. (2008). Imaginarios sociales de la vida campesina andina, expresados en la narrativa de la música carranguera. Tesis de grado, UCC, Bogotá.
 Moreno, Javier. (1982, febrero). Los Carrangueros de Ráquira: Cuatro carretas acerca de una vaina. Punto de Partida No. 2, p. 59-65. Bogotá.
 Paone, Renato. (1999). La Música Carranguera. Monografía universitaria, Escuela Popular de Arte, Medellín.
 Botero Zuluaga, Ángela. (2008, 30 de junio) Un chat con Jorge Velosa: “Mi deporte es conversar”. El Espectador. Colombia.
 González Restrepo, Guillermo ; Gutiérrez, Óscar; & Salcedo, Mauro. La música andina. El Espectador
 Cárdenas, Felipe. (2009). Narrativas del paisaje Andino colombiano. Visión ecológica en la obra de Jorge Velosa. Revista Iberoamericana de Antropología, Madrid, Volumen 4, Número 2. Mayo-Agosto.Pp. 269-293.
 Sonidos Colombianos (Realización: José Perilla). Conversatorio con Velosa y Los Carrangueros''. Radio Nacional (RTVC), 22 de octubre de 2009.

External links
 Centro Virtual de Documentación de la Música Carranguera
 MySpace site
 Traditional folkloric music blog

1949 births
1990s missing person cases
Colombian musicians
Colombian veterinarians
Formerly missing people
Living people
Kidnapped Colombian people
Missing person cases in Colombia
National University of Colombia alumni